Freinberg is a municipality in the district of Schärding in Upper Austria, Austria.
The municipality has an area of 20 square kilometers and population of 1494 (on 31 December 2005).

References

Cities and towns in Schärding District
Sauwald